WKXD-FM (106.9 MHz, "106.9 Kicks Country") is a radio station broadcasting a country music format. Licensed to Monterey, Tennessee, United States, the station is currently owned by Stonecom.

History
The Federal Communications Commission issued a construction permit for the station on September 10, 1985. The station was assigned the call sign WMCZ on December 3, 1985, and, on January 9, 1986, changed its call sign to WRJT. The station received its license to cover on August 2, 1989. On October 31, 1991, the station again changed its call sign to the current WKXD-FM. July 9, 2012 at 9am WKXD flipped from hot adult contemporary to country.

Until 2012, WKXD-FM was relayed on translator station 100.9 FM in Cookeville. W265BC is now W231DG and carries the programming of WUCT (1600 AM).

HD Radio
In July 2021, WKXD-FM began broadcasting in the HD Radio format. 93.3 The Dawg began broadcasting on July 8, 2021, on the HD2 subchannel with classic hip-hop.

On October 14, 2021, WKXD-FM launched a sports format on its HD3 subchannel, branded as "Sportsradio 104.7" (simulcast on translator W284DR 104.7 FM Cookeville).

References

External links

KXD-FM
Radio stations established in 1989
Country radio stations in the United States